Alice Y. Hom (born 1967) is an Asian American LGBTQ community activist and author.

Education 
Hom received her B.A from Yale, her M.A. in Asian American Studies from UCLA, and her Ph.D. in history from Claremont Graduate University. Her dissertation was titled “Unifying Differences: Lesbian of Color Community Building in Los Angeles & New York, 1970s-1980s”.

Activism and career 
Hom has been the Director of Asian American/Pacific Islanders in Philanthropy's Queer Justice Fund since 2010. She now is the Director of Equity and Social Justice  for The Northern California GrantMakers. She also is a host the Historically Queer Podcast. She was previously founding Director of the Intercultural Community Center at Occidental College, worked at the Getty Information Institute and Getty Research Institute. Hom has also served on the boards of the Astraea Lesbian Foundation for Justice, Visual Communications, Great Leap, June Mazer Lesbian Archives, and APAIT.

Hom was an editor on Q&A: Queer in Asian America, an award-winning anthology of essays, personal accounts, fiction, and art on the meaning of being LGBTQ in Asian American communities.

In 2013, Governor Jerry Brown reappointed Hom to another term on the Cal Humanities Board, where she has served since 2012.

Honors and awards 
 1998: Lambda Literary Award for Best Book in Lesbian and Gay Anthologies/Non-Fiction
 1999: Honorable Mention for Outstanding Books Awards, Gustavus Myers Center for Study of Bigotry and Human Rights in North America
 2001: Book Award from Association for Asian American Studies

Published works 
 
Unifying Differences: Lesbian of Color Community Building in Los Angeles & New York, 1970s-1980s (Claremont Graduate University: 2011)

Personal life 
Hom was born and raised in the Los Angeles, California area. She now resides in the Bay Area of California.

References

Further reading 
 AAPIP

1967 births
Living people
American LGBT people of Asian descent
American LGBT rights activists
People from Greater Los Angeles
University of California, Los Angeles alumni
Yale University alumni
Claremont Graduate University alumni
Place of birth missing (living people)
American lesbian writers
Writers from California
Activists from California
21st-century American LGBT people
21st-century American women writers